Malesherbes may refer to:
 Guillaume-Chrétien de Lamoignon de Malesherbes (1721–1794); French statesman, lawyer and defender of King Louis XVI
 Guillaume de Lamoignon de Blancmesnil (1683—1772); seigneur de Blancmesnil et de Malesherbes; father of Guillame-Chrétien, politician and statesman
 Malesherbes (Paris Métro); on Boulevard Malesherbes
 Malesherbes, Loiret; commune in France
 Malesherbes (Paris RER), railway station serving Malesherbes, Loiret
 SC Malesherbes; French football club

See also
 Louis Malesherbes Goldsborough (1805–1877) U.S. Admiral